The Estadio Olímpico Universitario is a multi-use stadium in Chihuahua, Chihuahua, Mexico.  It is currently used mostly for football, American football and concerts.  The stadium holds 22,000 people.

References

Sports venues in Chihuahua (state)
College association football venues in Mexico
Athletics (track and field) venues in Mexico
Olimpico Benito Juarez
Chihuahua City
College American football venues in Mexico
2007 establishments in Mexico
Sports venues completed in 2007